is a railway station in the city of  Ichinomiya, Aichi Prefecture, Japan, operated by Central Japan Railway Company (JR Tōkai). The station is physically joined to Meitetsu-Ichinomiya Station.

Lines
Owari-Ichinomiya Station is served by the Tōkaidō Main Line, and is located 383.1 kilometers from the starting point of the line at Tokyo Station.

Station layout
The station has two elevated island platforms with passing loops with the station building underneath. The station building has automated ticket machines, TOICA automated turnstiles and is staffed.

Platforms

Adjacent stations

Station history
Freight operations were discontinued in 1979. With the dissolution and privatization of the JNR on April 1, 1987, the station came under the control of the Central Japan Railway Company. A new station building was completed in 2012.

Station numbering was introduced to the section of the Tōkaidō Line operated JR Central in March 2018; Owari-Ichinomiya Station was assigned station number CA72.

Passenger statistics
In fiscal 2016, the station was used by an average of 26,809 passengers daily (boarding passengers only).

Surrounding area
 Meitetsu-Ichinomiya Station (Meitetsu Nagoya Main Line)
 Shubun University
 Masumida Shrine
 Japan National Route 155

See also
 List of Railway Stations in Japan

References

Yoshikawa, Fumio. Tokaido-sen 130-nen no ayumi. Grand-Prix Publishing (2002) .

External links

JR Central station information 

Railway stations in Japan opened in 1886
Railway stations in Aichi Prefecture
Tōkaidō Main Line
Stations of Central Japan Railway Company
Ichinomiya, Aichi